Dylan Wegela is an American politician. He has served in the Michigan House of Representatives for District 26 since 2023.

References

Members of the Michigan House of Representatives
Year of birth missing (living people)
Living people
Place of birth missing (living people)
Democratic Party members of the Michigan House of Representatives
21st-century American politicians